The 2022–23 Club Universidad Nacional season, commonly referred to as UNAM, is the club's 69th consecutive season in the top-flight of Mexican football. The team will participate in the Liga MX.

Squad 

Players and squad numbers last updated on 4 July 2022.Note: Flags indicate national team as has been defined under FIFA eligibility rules. Players may hold more than one non-FIFA nationality.

Club officials

Coaching staff

Source: Liga MX

Transfers and loans

In

Players transferred

Players loaned

Out

Players transferred

Players loaned

Kits 
Supplier: Nike

Pre-season and friendlies

Competitions

Overview

Liga MX

Torneo Apertura

League table

Results summary

Results round by round

Matches
The league fixtures were announced on 29 May 2022.

Statistics

Goalscorers 

Includes all competitive matches. The list is sorted numerically by squad number when total goals are equal.

Assists 

Includes all competitive matches. The list is sorted numerically by squad number when total assists are equal.

Source: Soccerway

Hat-tricks

Clean sheets 

Source: FBref.com

Disciplinary record

Notes

References

External links

Unam
Club Universidad Nacional seasons